Weijiang Township is a township in Longsheng Various Nationalities Autonomous County, Guangxi, China.

Etymology
The name of "Weijiang" is named after Weijiang Stream, which flows through the township north to south.

Administrative division
As of 2016, the township is divided into eight villages: 
 Ganjia 
 Yangwan 
 Bunong 
 Zhongdong 
 Limu 
 Xinzhai 
 Dawan 
 Chonglin

History
In 1933, it belonged to Madi Township.

It was incorporated as a township in November 1949 and was under the jurisdiction of the East District. In May 1953 it was renamed "Bunong Township" and came under the jurisdiction of the Third District. The Weijiang Commune was set up in May 1961. 

On December 9, 2016, the village of Xinzhai was listed among the fourth group of "List of Traditional Villages in China" by the State Council of China. On June 6, 2019, the village of Yangwan was listed among the fifth group of "List of Traditional Villages in China" by the State Council of China.

Geography
The township is situated at northwestern Longsheng Various Nationalities Autonomous County. The township is bordered to the north by Chengbu Miao Autonomous County, to the east by Madi Township, to the south by the towns of Lejiang and Longsheng, and to the west by the town of Pingdeng.

The Weijiang Stream, a tributary of the Pingdeng River, flows through the township north to south.

Economy
The local economy is primarily based upon agriculture and local industry.

Tourist attractions
The main attraction is the Weijiang Rice Terraces.

The Shunfeng Bridge, also known as "Red Army Bridge", is a provincial cultural relics protection unit.

The Pan Village Wind-rain Bridge, is the symbolized cultural landscape and architecture of the Miao people. It has a deep connotation of culture, philosophy and architecture art, it also contains plenty of ecological aesthetic implications.

The Xiabilin Waterfall is a famous scenic spot in the township.

References

Bibliography

Townships of Guilin